Achnatherum roshevitzii (Roshevich's achnatherum) is a species of grass that is endemic to Azerbaijan, and is only known from the Quba District. It occurs on sandy grasslands in lower montane areas. This species is threatened by overgrazing and hay making activities, and there are no conservation measures in place.

References

roshevitzii
Bunchgrasses of Asia
Endemic flora of Azerbaijan
Vulnerable flora of Asia